Whites City is a census-designated place and unincorporated community in Eddy County, New Mexico, United States. Its population was 7 as of the 2010 census. By 2020 the population increased to 85. Whites City has a post office with ZIP code 88268.

Whites City began in the 1920s as a commercial resort owned by Charlie White. The community is primarily a resort town for visitors to nearby Carlsbad Caverns National Park. U.S. Route 62, 180, and New Mexico State Road 7 all pass through the community.

It is within the Carlsbad Municipal School District, which operates Carlsbad High School.

Demographics

References

Census-designated places in New Mexico
Census-designated places in Eddy County, New Mexico